Mark Nepo (born February 23, 1951, in Brooklyn, New York), is a poet and spiritual adviser who has taught in the fields of poetry and spirituality for over 40 years.  Nepo is best known for his New York Times #1 bestseller, The Book of Awakening. He has published 23 books and recorded 15 audio projects. A cancer survivor, Nepo writes and teaches about the journey of inner transformation and the life of relationship.

Nepo has a doctorate in English. He taught for 18 years at the State University of New York in Albany, New York. He then moved to Kalamazoo, Michigan. In his 30s he was diagnosed with a rare form of lymphoma, a struggle which helped to form his philosophy of experiencing life fully while staying in relationship to an unknowable future.

In 2010 Oprah Winfrey chose Nepo′'s The Book of Awakening as one of her Ultimate Favorite Things for her farewell season, launching it to the #1 spot on the New York Times bestseller list. Nepo has appeared several times with Oprah Winfrey on her Super Soul Sunday program on OWN TV,  and was named to Oprah's SuperSoul100 list of visionaries and influential leaders.  He was also interviewed by Robin Roberts on Good Morning America.  Oprah has also written about Nepo in her O! magazine column, "What I Know for Sure," and featured him on her “The Life You Want” class on Being Fully Present in April 2022.

Recent work includes Surviving Storms (St. Martin's Essentials Sept 2022), The Book of Soul (St. Martin's Essentials, 2020), a Nautilus Book Award Winner and named by Spirituality & Practice as one of the Best Spiritual Books of 2020; Drinking from the River of Light (Sounds True, 2019), a Nautilus Book Award Winner; More Together Than Alone (Atria, 2018) cited as one of the Best Spiritual Books of 2018 by Spirituality & Practice; Things That Join the Sea and the Sky (Sounds True, 2017), a Nautilus Book Award Winner; The Way Under the Way: The Place of True Meeting (Sounds True, 2016), a Nautilus Book Award Winner; The One Life We're Given (Atria, 2016 ) cited by Spirituality & Practice as one of the Best Spiritual Books of 2016; Inside the Miracle (Sounds True) selected by Spirituality & Health Magazine as one of the top ten best books of 2015; The Endless Practice (Atria) cited by Spirituality & Practice as one of the Best Spiritual Books of 2014; and Seven Thousand Ways to Listen (Atria), which won the 2012 Books for a Better Life Award. The Exquisite Risk was listed by Spirituality & Practice as one of the Best Spiritual Books of 2005, calling it "one of the best books we've ever read on what it takes to live an authentic life." Mark became a regular columnist for Spirituality & Health Magazine in 2017.

In 2015, Mark was given a Life-Achievement Award by AgeNation. And in 2016, he was named by Watkins: Mind Body Spirit as one of the 100 Most Spiritually Influential Living People.

For more information visit Mark at marknepo.com, Live.MarkNepo.com, threeintentions.com and harrywalker.com.

Books 
Surviving Storms: Finding the Strength to Meet Adversity (St. Martin's Essentials, 2022)
 20th Anniversary Edition of The Book of Awakening, with a new Foreword by Jamie Lee Curtis Red Wheel, 2020
The Book of Soul: 52 Paths to Living What Matters (St. Martin's Essentials, 2020)
Drinking from the River of Light: The Life of Expression (Sounds True, 2019)
More Together Than Alone: Discovering the Power and Spirit of Community in Our Lives and in the World (Atria Books, 2018)
Things that Join the Sea and the Sky (Sounds True, 2017)
Inside the Miracle: Enduring Suffering, Approaching Wholeness (Sounds True, 2015)
The Endless Practice: Becoming Who You Were Born to Be (Atria Books, 2014)
The Little Book of Awakening (Conari Press, 2013)
Reduced to Joy (Viva Editions, 2013)
Seven Thousand Ways to Listen (Free Press, 2012)
The Book of Awakening (Red Wheel-Conari, 2000)
As Far As the Heart Can See (HCI Books, Sept 2011)
Finding Inner Courage (Red Wheel-Conari, Feb 2011, originally published as Facing the Lion, Being the Lion, 2007)
The Book of Awakening (CD Box Set, Simon & Schuster, March 2011)
Finding Inner Courage (CD Box Set, Simon & Schuster, March 2011)
Staying Awake (CD Box Set, Sounds True, Spring 2012)
Holding Nothing Back (CD Box Set, Sounds True, Spring 2012)
Surviving Has Made Me Crazy (CavanKerry Press, 2007)
Unlearning Back to God: Essays on Inwardness (collected essays) (Khaniqahi Nimatullahi Publications, 2006)
Deepening the American Dream: Reflections on the Inner Life and Spirit of Democracy (Editor) (Jossey-Bass, 2005)
The Exquisite Risk: Daring to Live an Authentic Life (Three Rivers Press, 2005)
Suite for the Living   (Bread for the Journey International, 2004)
Inhabiting Wonder (Bread for the Journey International, 2004)
Acre of Light (Greenfield Review Press, 1994, also available as an audiotape from Parabola under the title Inside the Miracle, 1996)
Fire Without Witness (British American Ltd., 1988)
God, the Maker of the Bed, and the Painter (Greenfield Review Press, 1988)

Nepo's work has been translated into twenty languages, including French, Portuguese, Japanese, and Danish.

References

External links
 
 Official Facebook page

1951 births
American male poets
Living people
American spiritual writers
Musicians from Brooklyn
State University of New York faculty
Writers from Kalamazoo, Michigan
American spoken word artists
American male non-fiction writers